Countess Mary of Nassau-Siegen (2 February 1418 – 11 October 1472), official titles: Gräfin zu Nassau, Vianden und Diez, Frau zu Breda, was a countess from the House of Nassau-Siegen, a cadet branch of the Ottonian Line of the House of Nassau, and through marriage Countess of Nassau-Wiesbaden-Idstein.

Biography
Mary was born on 2 February 1418 as the second daughter and fifth child of Count Engelbert I of Nassau-Siegen and his wife Lady Joanne of Polanen.

Mary got engaged on 6 January 1428 and married in Breda on 17 June 1437 to Count John of Nassau-Wiesbaden-Idstein (1419 – 9 May 1480). Both Mary and John descended from Count Henry II of Nassau, Mary through his son Otto I and John through his son Walram II. John had succeeded his father Adolf II as Count of Nassau-Wiesbaden-Idstein in 1426.

Mary came into conflict with her eldest brother Count John IV of Nassau-Siegen. She filed a complaint against her brother with Emperor Frederick III for forcibly removing her inheritance and goods. On 14 October 1463, the Emperor appointed Abbot  of Fulda as his attorney and instructed him to summon both parties to a trial on his behalf, to interrogate them and to give judgment. The abbot could – if necessary – examine witnesses and – if necessary – threaten these witnesses with punishment in order to force them to testify, as well as to carry out the proceedings in all respects in the event that one of the parties did not appear. The abbot summoned John by letter of 17 August 1464 to appear before him 45 days later in Salmünster. John received this summons on 2 September 1464 in Vianden from the hands of the servus et nuncius of the abbot.

The abbot’s judgment is unknown, as is what happened next. However, on 7 July 1465, the Emperor informed Mary that John had appealed against the judgment by Archbishop John II of Trier unfavourable to him, and summoned her to appear before him on the 45th day after receipt of this summons or on the first day of the following court and informed her that, even if she did not appear, the trial would take place. What happened afterwards is also unclear. What is known is that the Emperor summoned John for the settlement of the inheritance dispute with his sister, because on 9 February 1467 Mary appointed attorneys for the trial. That is the last preserved record of the dispute.

Mary died on 11 October 1472 and was buried in the Unionskirche in Idstein. The epitaph once placed in the choir for Mary and John, which probably disappeared when the church was rebuilt after 1660, showed the couple standing side by side. John wore the body armour typical for the time and a rosary instead of a sword, as well as a lance. To his right, Mary was depicted in a long robe, cloak, veil and holding a rosary. At the feet of both figures were their coats of arms, at the heads the crests. At the edge of the epitaph was the inscription:‘+ Anno d(omi)ni m cccc Ixxii / die ii me(n)s(i)s octobris o(biit) G(e)n(er)osa d(omi)na maria ac nassawe comitissa i(n) nassawe / c(uius) a(n)i(m)a req(ui)escat i(n) pace.

Issue
From the marriage of Mary and John the following children were born:
 Mary (1438 – 14 January 1480), married on 25 May 1455 to Count Louis II of Isenburg-Büdingen (1422 – Büdingen, 4 June 1511).
  (1439 – 27 February 1482), was canon in Mainz en Liège.
 Margaret (? – 27 May 1486), was Abbess of Klarenthal Abbey.
 Anne (1442 – 1 March 1480), married in Mainz on 1 January 1464 to Count Otto II of Solms-Braunfels (22 November 1426 – 29 June 1504).
 Count Adolf III (10 November 1443 – Wiesbaden, 6 July 1511), succeed his father as Count of Nassau-Wiesbaden in 1480. He married on 20 June 1484 to Countess Margaret of Hanau-Lichtenberg (15 May 1463 – 26 May 1504).
 Bertha (1446 – 12 April ....), was Abbess of Klarenthal Abbey.
  (1448 – Mainz, 7 April 1508), was canon in Cologne and Mainz.
 Count Philip (1450 – 16 June 1509), succeed his father as Count of Nassau-Idstein in 1480. He married in 1470 to Countess palatine  (10 July 1456 – 7 September 1527).
 Anne (? – 2 June ....), was nun in Klarenthal Abbey.

Ancestors

Notes

References

Sources
 
 
 
 
 
  (1882). Het vorstenhuis Oranje-Nassau. Van de vroegste tijden tot heden (in Dutch). Leiden: A.W. Sijthoff/Utrecht: J.L. Beijers.

External links
 Graf Johann II. von Nassau-Wiesbaden-Idstein und seine Ehefrau Maria von Nassau-Dillenburg 1472/1480, Idstein (in German). In: Landesgeschichtliches Informationssystem Hessen (LAGIS).
 Nassau. In: Medieval Lands. A prosopography of medieval European noble and royal families, by Charles Cawley.
 Nassau Part 4. In: An Online Gotha, by Paul Theroff.

|-

1418 births
1472 deaths
Mary of Nassau-Siegen
Mary of Nassau-Siegen
15th-century German women